Anna Bondár was the defending champion but chose not to participate.

Danka Kovinić won the title, defeating Nastasja Schunk in the final, 6–3, 7–6(7–0).

Seeds

Draw

Finals

Top half

Bottom half

References

Main Draw

Wiesbaden Tennis Open - Singles